Samoa competed at the 2008 Summer Paralympics in Beijing, China. The country's delegation consisted of a single competitor, track and field athlete Mose Faatamala. It was Faatamala's third consecutive appearance at the Summer Paralympics.

Athletics

See also
Samoa at the Paralympics
Samoa at the 2008 Summer Olympics

References

External links
International Paralympic Committee
Beijing 2008 Paralympic Games Official Site

Nations at the 2008 Summer Paralympics
2008
Summer Paralympics